The 1972–73 All-Ireland Senior Club Hurling Championship was the third staging of the All-Ireland Senior Club Hurling Championship, the Gaelic Athletic Association's premier inter-county club hurling tournament. The championship began on 26 November 1972 and ended on 9 December 1973.

Blackrock of Cork were the defending champions, however, they failed to qualify after being defeated by St. Finbarr's in the opening round of the Cork Championship.

On 9 December 1973, Glen Rovers won the championship after a 2-18 to 2-08 defeat of St. Rynagh's in the All-Ireland final. It was their first ever championship title.

Qualification

Results

Connacht Senior Club Hurling Championship

Craobh Rua V Carrick 21/01
Tremane V Toureen 21/01

Quarter-finals

Semi-final

Final

Leinster Senior Club Hurling Championship

First round

Quarter-finals

Semi-finals

Final

Munster Senior Club Hurling Championship

Quarter-finals

Semi-finals

Final

Ulster Senior Club Hurling Championship

Final

All-Ireland Senior Club Hurling Championship

Semi-finals

Final

References

1972 in hurling
1973 in hurling
All-Ireland Senior Club Hurling Championship